The Pirates of Malaysia is an exotic adventure novel written by Italian author Emilio Salgari, published in 1896. It features his most famous character, Sandokan, and is a sequel to The Tigers of Mompracem.

Synopsis
Sandokan and Yanez De Gomera, the protagonists of The Tigers of Mompracem, are back, righting injustices and fighting old foes. Tremal-Naik's misfortunes have continued. Wrongfully imprisoned, the great hunter has been banished from India and sentenced to life in a penal colony. Knowing his master is innocent, Kammamuri dashes off to the rescue, planning to free the good hunter at the first opportunity. When the good servant is captured by the Tigers of Mompracem, he manages to enlist their services. But in order to succeed, Sandokan and Yanez must lead their men against the forces of James Brooke, "The Exterminator", the dreaded White Rajah of Sarawak.

Sources
Salgari used as a source the book A Visit to the Indian Archipelago in H.M. Ship Maeander: With Portions of the Private Journal of Sir James Brooke, K.C.B. by Henry Keppel. Pangeran Macota, Sandokan's ally, was in fact one of James Brooke's bitterest enemies.

See also

Novels in the Sandokan Series:
The Mystery of the Black Jungle
The Tigers of Mompracem
The Two Tigers
The King of the Sea
Quest for a Throne

Novels in The Black Corsair series 
The Black Corsair
The Queen of the Caribbean
Son of the Red Corsair

External links
Read the first chapter
Read a review of the Sandokan series at SFSite.com.
Read a Sandokan Biography
Read a review at Pirates and Privateers.
Italy’s enduring love affair with Emilio Salgari, The Economist, June 2017

1896 novels
Novels by Emilio Salgari
Novels set in Malaysia
19th-century Italian novels
Italian adventure novels
Italian novels adapted into films